Barbara Ann Brown (October 18, 1901 – July 7, 1975) was an American actress.

Early life
Barbara Brown was born in 1901 in Los Angeles, California, to Selma C. (née Teutschmann) and Edward Brown. Her mother was the daughter of German immigrants.

Career
Brown began acting on the stage in California. In 1922, she had leading roles in Oliver Morosco's productions Wait Till We're Married and Abie's Irish Rose. She went on to act in Broadway plays such as Relations (1928), Mother Lode (1934), Play, Genius, Play! (1935), Behind Red Lights (1937), Sun Kissed (1937), Our Town (1938), and Liberty Jones (1941).

Brown began appearing in films in the early 1940s. She played Mrs. Delfina Acuña, the mother of Rita Hayworth's character, in You Were Never Lovelier (1942), starring Fred Astaire and Hayworth. In 1944, she was cast in Janie and Hollywood Canteen. She and Ray Collins played Ma and Pa Kettle's in-laws in the comedies Ma and Pa Kettle Back on the Farm (1951) and Ma and Pa Kettle on Vacation (1953). She had a supporting role in the Abbott and Costello comedy Jack and the Beanstalk (1952).

Personal life and death
She married Forrest Taylor Jr., son of actor Forrest Taylor, in 1939 in New York City. Taylor died in 1968. Brown died on July 7, 1975 in Los Angeles, aged 73, from undisclosed causes. Both were interred at Forest Lawn Memorial Park, Hollywood Hills.

References

External links

 
 
 
 1922 photograph of Barbara Brown

1901 births
1975 deaths
20th-century American actresses
Actresses from Los Angeles
American stage actresses
American film actresses
American television actresses
American people of German descent
Burials at Forest Lawn Memorial Park (Hollywood Hills)